Mohnish Bipinbhai Parmar (born 12 April 1987 in Baroda, Gujarat) is a right-arm off-break bowler from India. He played for India Under-19s [cricket] team and currently plays for the Gujarat cricket team. He was picked by the Kolkata Knight Riders franchise in 2009.He has modelled his action on the great Sri Lankan Off-Spinner Muttiah Muralidaran.

References

People from Vadodara
1988 births
Living people
Indian cricketers
Gujarat cricketers
West Zone cricketers
India Red cricketers
Kolkata Knight Riders cricketers